Tom Van Imschoot (born 4 September 1981 in Tienen) is a Belgian former footballer and manager who is currently managing Lierse Kempenzonen.

Career

Club
Tom Van Imschoot began his career with Sint-Truidense in 2002 and he played with them for three seasons, making 59 league appearances and scored 5 goals during his time at the Stayen. In 2005, Van Imschoot joined Westerlo he made his debut for Westerlo in the 2-0 win against Cercle Brugge on 6 August 2005. He went on to make 109 league appearances, scoring 4 goals during four seasons at the Het Kuipje. He then joined Mons in the summer of 2009 and was part of the squad that was promoted to the Belgian Pro League in 2010. He made 84 league appearances and scored 10 goals during his time at the Stade Charles Tondreau.

References

External links
 

1981 births
Living people
Belgian footballers
Sint-Truidense V.V. players
K.V.C. Westerlo players
R.A.E.C. Mons players
K.V. Oostende players
FC Eindhoven players
Belgian Pro League players
Eerste Divisie players
People from Tienen
Association football midfielders
Lommel S.K. managers
K.R.C. Genk non-playing staff
Belgian First Division B managers
Footballers from Flemish Brabant